Mkhuleko Hlengwa (born 12 June 1987) is a South African politician who serves as a Member of the National Assembly for the Inkatha Freedom Party (IFP). He is the Chairperson of parliament's Standing Committee on Public Accounts (SCOPA). He became a Member of the National Assembly in February 2012 and has served on the SCOPA committee since 2014. Hlengwa was previously the National Chairperson of the IFP Youth Brigade.

Life and career
Hlengwa was born in Durban. His father, Mhlabunzima Hlengwa, served as an IFP MP from 1994 until 2004. He became a party activist at the young age of 10 in 1997 and soon became National Chairperson of the IFP Youth Brigade.

He was sworn in as a Member of the National Assembly in May 2012 and consequently became one of the youngest parliamentarians.

Following his re-election in May 2014, Hlengwa became a member of the Standing Committee on Public Accounts.

In June 2019, the African National Congress offered the SCOPA chairpersonship to the IFP. The party accepted and nominated Hlengwa to head the committee. He took office in July 2019. Mthokozisi Nxumalo succeeded him as National Chairperson of the IFP Youth Brigade.

References

External links
 People's Assembly profile
 Parliament of South Africa profile
 Our Leadership

Living people
1987 births
Zulu people
Members of the National Assembly of South Africa
Inkatha Freedom Party politicians
People from Durban
People from KwaZulu-Natal
Politicians from KwaZulu-Natal